Benjamin Peirce (30 September 1778 – 26 July 1831) was librarian of the Harvard Library from 1826 to 1831.

Early life and education
Peirce, born in Salem, 30 September 1778, was the son of Jerahmeel and Sarah (Ropes) Peirce. After graduating from Harvard College at the head of the class of 1801, he returned to Salem and entered the India trade with his father. He was a representative to the Massachusetts General Court from Salem for several years and a Massachusetts State Senator from Essex County in 1811.

Career
But neither a mercantile nor a political life fully satisfied him and he was glad to accept in 1826 the position of Librarian at Harvard. He at once set about the preparation of a catalogue of the Library which was published in 1830-31 in four volumes : the first two containing an alphabetical catalogue by authors, the third a systematic index, and the fourth a catalogue of maps.

It was, perhaps, partly the labor involved in making this catalogue that caused his health to break down. The last volume had hardly come from the press, when Peirce died, 26 July 1831, aged 53. He had left in manuscript a great part of a History of Harvard University, from its foundation, in the year 1636, to the period of the American Revolution.  This was edited by
his friend John Pickering, and published in 1833 (Cambridge; Brown, Shattuck and Company. 8°. pp. XX., 316, 160). Quincy, in his History of Harvard, describes the book as "of great merit and usefulness, possessing the traits of that soundness
of judgment and accuracy of investigation so eminently his characteristics." He also published an Oration delivered at Salem, 4th of July, 1812.

Personal life
He married, 11 December 1803, Lydia R. Nichols. His son Benjamin Peirce was a distinguished mathematician, and for many years Perkins professor of astronomy and mathematics. One of his three other children Charles Henry Peirce was a physician in Salem and Cambridge.

American librarians
Harvard University faculty
Harvard University librarians
1778 births
1831 deaths
Harvard College alumni
Massachusetts state senators
Members of the Massachusetts House of Representatives